Kerem Bürsin (born 4 June 1987) is a Turkish actor, known for his role in the TV shows Güneşi Beklerken (2013−2014), Şeref Meselesi (2014−2015) and Sen Çal Kapımı (2020–2021).

Life and career
Bürsin has lived in numerous countries including Scotland, Indonesia, the UAE, Turkey, Malaysia, and the US. In 1999, at the age of 12 he moved with his family to the United States. He graduated from Emerson College's marketing communications department, and took acting lessons while he was in university. He was chosen as the best theater actor at a competition in high school in the US. Before he became an actor, he used to work as a driver. 

Bürsin had previously appeared in American TV movies including Sharktopus in 2010. On 9 September 2013, he appeared on Line's commercial for social messaging application. Bürsin became known with his role as "Kerem Sayer" on Kanal D's Güneşi Beklerken and portrayed the deformed twin of the character named "Güneş Sayer" on the final episode of the series, alongside Hande Doğandemir In Çağan Irmak's movie Unutursam Fısılda played the role of a musician named Erhan. Bürsin follows both Hollywood-Turkish productions and prefers to use both English and Turkish languages in acting. He has also won the Seoul International Best Actor award.

Bürsin was cast in a leading role of "Serkan Bolat" in Sen Çal Kapımı ("You Knock on My Door") with Hande Erçel The series is produced by MF Yapım, directed by Yusuf Pirhasan, Ender Mıhlar, Altan Dönmez and its script is written by Ayşe Üner Kutlu. It premiered on FOX on 8 July 2020 receiving positive reviews as well as high ratings.

Filmography

Movies

Web series

TV series

Short films

Theater

As producer 
 Kiss of Death
 Kelebekler
 Yaşamayanlar

Programs 
 Büyük Risk (2014)

References

External links 
 
 May 2016 Interview With Kerem Bürsin (archive copy)
 

21st-century Turkish male actors
Living people
1987 births
Male actors from Istanbul
Turkish male film actors
Turkish male television actors